was a professional wrestling event promoted by World Wonder Ring Stardom. The event took place on March 11, 2022, in Tokyo, Japan at the Shinagawa Intercity Hall, with a limited attendance due in part to the ongoing COVID-19 pandemic at the time.

Event
The "New Blood" is a series of events which mainly focus on matches where rookie wrestlers, usually with three or less years of in-ring experience, evolve. Besides wrestlers from Stardom, various superstars from multiple promotions of the Japanese independent scene are invited to compete in bouts that are usually going under the stipulation of singles or tag team matches.

The show featured a total of six professional wrestling matches that resulted from scripted storylines, where wrestlers portrayed villains, heroes, or less distinguishable characters in the scripted events that built tension and culminated in a wrestling match or series of matches. The press conference for the event was held on March 1, 2022 and was broadcast on Stardom's YouTube channel.

Storylines
The event featured various competitors from other promotions (Gatoh Move Pro Wrestling, Professional Wrestling Just Tap Out, Marvelous That's Women Pro Wrestling and World Woman Pro Wrestling Diana) which at the time of it, several of them were still in their rookie years of professional wrestling. The show also portraited the return of Saya Iida who was sidelined with injury for almost one year. Another special featuring of the event was the in-ring debut of Miyu Amasaki (real name Miyu Matsuda) who had her first-ever confrontation against Utami Hayashishita.

All the matches of the pay-per-view have been broadcast live on YouTube. The show began with the confrontation between Stars stable member Momo Kohgo and Sayaka from Gatoh Move Pro Wrestling which concluded with the victory of Kohgo as the preshow match. The following bout portrayed Ai Houzan & Maria from Marvelous picking a victory over Cosmic Angels' members Unagi Sayaka & Waka Tsukiyama. Their encounter ended with Maria having a grudge over Sayaka, leaving them to engage in a brief altercation. The third match saw Saya Kamitani & Lady C going into a 15-minute time-limit draw against Mirai & Mai Sakurai. The fourth match captioned a returning Saya Iida teaming up with Stars stablemate, the then-time Future of Stardom Champion Hanan defeating JTO's Aoi & Tomoka Inaba. The moment concluded with a brief staredown between Hanan and the then-time Sendai Girls Junior Champion Inaba who raised their belts following their staredown. The fifth match depicted Oedo Tai's Starlight Kid & Ruaka successfully battling Diana's Nanami and one half of the World Woman Pro-Wrestling Diana Tag Team Champions, Haruka Umesaki. 

The main event portraited the showdown between Utami Hayashishita and the debuting Miyu Amasaki. Despite the latter's loss, Hayashishita was impressed by Amasaki's performance and invited her to join Queen's Quest, request which Amasaki accepted.

Results

References

External links
Page Stardom World

2022 in professional wrestling
2022 in Tokyo
World Wonder Ring Stardom shows
Professional wrestling in Tokyo